André Ducharme (born 23 July 1961) is a Québécois author, comedian and humorist. He was part of the Rock et Belles Oreilles group (RBO) from 1981 to 1995. He was credited as André G. Ducharme in RBO; "G. Ducharme" has the same sound in French as "J'ai du charme," which means "I have charm" or "I am charming."

References

Living people
French Quebecers
Comedians from Quebec
Canadian male television actors
Male actors from Quebec
Canadian sketch comedians
1961 births
Canadian male comedians